Devil (also known as The Night Chronicles 1: Devil) is a 2010 American supernatural horror film directed by John Erick Dowdle. The screenplay by Brian Nelson was from a story by M. Night Shyamalan. Starring Chris Messina, Logan Marshall-Green, Geoffrey Arend, Bojana Novakovic, Jenny O'Hara, and Bokeem Woodbine, the film revolves around five strangers who become trapped in an elevator. Devil was released on September 17, 2010. Critics praised the film's atmosphere and performances, but criticized the short running-time and story.

Plot
A Bible verse, 1 Peter 5:8, appears onscreen. An unseen man narrates with a story about his childhood, where his mother explained the circumstances that surround The Devil roaming the earth. A man jumps to his death from a skyscraper, leaving a suicide note about the Devil's approaching presence. Shortly thereafter, an elevator in the building gets stuck with five people inside: a temporary security guard, a mechanic/former soldier, a mattress salesman, a young woman, and an elderly woman. A repairman cannot get the elevator working and nearly dies while attempting to do this.

In the elevator, the lights frequently flicker and turn off completely for intervals. During an interval, one of the security guards, Ramirez, watching through the security camera sees a face on the monitor he believes is the devil, but his partner Lustig doubts it. At the same time, the young woman feels something on her back and the group becomes suspicious of the mattress salesman. When the lights return, the young woman has a bite mark on her back and the salesman has blood on his hands. Detective Bowden, who was investigating the earlier suicide, is called to the scene.

The lights go out again, and the elevator mirrors break. When the lights return, the mattress salesman's jugular vein is impaled with a broken mirror shard and he dies, escalating it into a crime scene investigation. Outside, security guards, the repair technician, and the fire department attempt to get in, to no avail. The passengers begin to suspect each other, while the security guards monitoring through the camera talk to them one-way via the speaker, as they cannot hear the passengers. As the group argues, the repair technician's rappelling device breaks and he falls to his death on top of the elevator, terrifying the occupants. Ramirez tries to convince the detectives that this could be The Devil's Meeting, but is unsuccessful. An unknown woman attempts to enter the building unsuccessfully, and goes around to the back.

Bowden and his partner use the sign-in sheet and elevator camera to identify the group. The temporary guard is identified as Ben Larson, who has a criminal record of assault and beating someone into a coma. The mattress salesman is identified as Vince McCormick, who lost many people their assets through a Ponzi scheme. The young woman is identified as Sarah Caraway, who is married to a rich man and plans leaving him after stealing his money, as she has done before. The elderly woman is identified as Jane Kowski, who was caught on the security camera stealing a woman’s wallet. The mechanic and former soldier cannot be identified due to him not signing in, making him the main suspect.

Upon review of security footage, the detectives see the mechanic had entered the building with a bag he does not have anymore. They find the bag filled with tools hidden in the lobby bathroom and suspect him more. Suddenly, the lights in the elevator flicker and shut off a fourth time. When they turn back on, the older woman is seen hanging from the ceiling by her neck via a light cable.

Ramirez shows Bowden the devil face he saw earlier, but Bowden does not believe him. Bowden then discusses the death of his wife and son: they were killed in a hit-and-run five years prior, and the driver left a note that said "I'm so sorry" at the scene.

As the detectives investigate the soldier, Ben and the soldier get in a fight, each suspecting the other as the killer. Sarah tells Ben to kill the soldier before he kills them and Ben attacks the soldier. Bowden comes back to the control room and diffuses the situation by having the passengers put their hands on the wall. Out of answers, Bowden asks Ramirez how to save them, if the devil is truly there. Ramirez responds, "They all die."  Lustig goes into the basement to shut off the power where the fire fighters are drilling into the wall.  He notices a shorted wire on the floor and attempts to move it.

The detectives talk to the lawyer the young woman was supposed to meet with and try to contact Sarah's husband. Lustig, severely shocked, causes a scene by stumbling into the lobby and collapsing amidst the crowd. Bowden calls for the medics. In the elevator, Sarah takes her hands off the wall, but the soldier tells her to put them back. Bowden discovers that Sarah took all her husband's money and her husband might know it. After learning the husband owns the building's security company, they suspect the husband hired Ben to kill Sarah and that he killed the others to cover it. However, the fourth outage ends with Ben's neck broken.

The soldier and Sarah suspect each other, arming themselves with mirror shards, but Bowden defuses the situation by telling them about his recovery from alcoholism following his family's death. The lights go out again, and Sarah's throat is slit. The soldier tries to stop the bleeding.

The unknown woman from before is brought into the control room. She tells them that the soldier is her fiancé. He actually came for a job interview and he did not want to take his tools along, so he hid them. He has requested his fiancee to fetch him after the interview. His name is Tony Janekowski. The detectives realize he had signed in, and Jane Kowski, the elderly woman's presumed identity, was not real. The Devil manifests in the form of the elderly woman. Tony tries to trade his life for Sarah, but the devil says he cannot do that. Tony grabs the radio and confesses that he fled from a fatal accident five years ago. Bowden realizes that Tony is responsible for the death of his family.

The Devil, powerless now that Tony has repented, vanishes after causing the elevator to plunge several floors. The firefighters are finally able to get in, but the old lady is gone. As the corpses of Sarah, Ben, and Vince are wheeled away, Bowden decides to take Tony into custody, and, while en route, reveals to Tony that it was his family in that accident. Much to his own surprise, he forgives Tony.

Cast
 Chris Messina as Detective Bowden
 Logan Marshall-Green as Tony Janekowski, The Mechanic and Former Soldier 
 Geoffrey Arend as Vince McCormick, Salesman 
 Bojana Novakovic as Sarah Caraway, Young Woman 
 Jenny O'Hara as Jane Kowski, Old Woman, The Devil
 Bokeem Woodbine as Ben Larson, Guard
 Matt Craven as Lustig, Building Security
 Jacob Vargas as Ramirez, Building Security
 Joseph Cobden as Dwight, Elevator Repairman
 Caroline Dhavernas as Elsa Nahai
 Joshua Peace as Detective Markowitz
 Zoie Palmer as Cheryl
 Vincent Laresca as Henry

Production
In October 2008 M. Night Shyamalan and Media Rights Capital announced that Devil would be made with the Dowdle brothers as directors and Brian Nelson as screenwriter.

Filming started on October 26, 2009 in Toronto with John Erick Dowdle as director and Drew Dowdle as an executive producer. There was additional shooting for the film several months later in Los Angeles and Philadelphia.

Joe Cobden had to train for four months to prepare for his role. He said that preparing for his death scene, which took four days to shoot, was the hardest scene to shoot except for the introduction and closing.

Story sources
John Erick Dowdle and Drew Dowdle said that the movie is based on a Devil's Meeting, which is a premise that the Devil is on Earth to test evildoers by tormenting them. Shyamalan acknowledged that the basic structure of the story was "an Agatha Christie nod." In Christie's 1939 novel And Then There Were None, as in Devil, a group of people with guilty pasts are trapped in an isolated area and begin to die one by one. Overall, it was inspired by the 2009 manga "Akumu no Elevator" by author Kinoshita Handa and illustrator Roppongi Aya.

Release
The film was set to have a release date on February 11, 2011, but was bumped up to September 17, 2010. The film's trailer debuted online on July 13, 2010.

Critical reception
The film was not screened to critics in advance. Review aggregator Rotten Tomatoes gives the film a score of 49% based on 99 reviews, with an average rating of 5.20/10. The site's consensus reads, "It's better than many of the other films M. Night Shyamalan has been associated with, but Devil never gets more than a few low-budget thrills out of its fiendishly promising premise."

Dennis Harvey of Variety gave Devil a lukewarm review, saying "Like the solid B-thrillers of yore that often outshone A-pics topping double bills, M. Night Shyamalan-produced Devil is nothing very special or original, but it gets the job done briskly and economically."

Home media
Devil was released to DVD and Blu-ray Disc on December 21, 2010.

Unproduced sequels
Devil was intended to be the first of The Night Chronicles trilogy, which involved the supernatural within modern urban society. In June 2010, Shyamalan announced the second film titled 12 Strangers, later changed to Reincarnate. The film was about a jury discussing a case dealing with the supernatural. Chris Sparling was set to write the script and Daniel Stamm would direct. Shyamalan also confirmed that the story for the currently untitled third installment was going to be taken from the abandoned sequel to Unbreakable. As of 2020, neither film has been produced, but his unused Unbreakable sequel idea later became the basis for Split.

References

External links

 
 
 
 
 
 

2010 films
2010 horror films
American supernatural horror films
American horror thriller films
2010 horror thriller films
Films shot in Toronto
Films shot in New York City
The Devil in film
Films set in Philadelphia
Media Rights Capital films
Blinding Edge Pictures films
Universal Pictures films
Films set in elevators
Films directed by John Erick Dowdle
Films produced by M. Night Shyamalan
Films produced by Sam Mercer
Films with screenplays by M. Night Shyamalan
Films scored by Fernando Velázquez
2010s English-language films
2010s American films